Adekunle Ajasin University, Akungba-Akoko (AAUA) is a state government owned and operated Nigerian university. The university is located in Akungba Akoko, Ondo State, Nigeria.

History 
Adekunle Ajasin University was first established as Obafemi Awolowo University in March 1982 by the government of the old Ondo State, headed by the late Chief Michael Adekunle Ajasin. The immediately succeeding military government of Navy Commodore Michael Bamidele Otiko changed its name to Ondo State University in 1985. Its relocation to Akungba Akoko in the new Ondo State became imperative in 1999, following the creation of a new state out of the old Ondo three years earlier in October 1996. The bill backing the relocation was signed into law by the then Governor of the State, Chief Adebayo Adefarati, in November 1999, and that prompted the movement of a crop of workers from the old site in Ado-Ekiti to Akungba Akoko on 1 December 1999. The bill for yet another name change, this time to Adekunle Ajasin University, in order to immortalise the late Governor Ajasin, was signed into law by Governor Adefarati in 2004 following the demise of the former. The amended and subsisting statute of the university was signed into law in November 2007 by yet another governor, the former Governor Olusegun Agagu. In these circumstances, it can rightly be said that while the history of AAUA started in 1982, its relocation on 5 November 1999 marked the beginning of the second phase of its history now in its present location, Akungba Akoko.

Academics 
Adekunle Ajasin University offers undergraduate and post-graduate as well as Pre-degree, JUPEB programmes in fields of specialization ranging from Science, Arts, Education, Law, Social and Management sciences, Agricultural science, Environmental Design and Management.

The university has seven (7) faculties 

Below is the list of departments:
 Accounting
 Adult Education
 Architecture
 Arts Education
 Animal and Environmental Biology
 Agricultural Economics and Extension
 Agronomy
 Animal Science
 Banking and Finance
 Biochemistry
 Business Administration
 Chemical Sciences
 Computer Science
 Commercial and Industrial Law
 Criminology and Security Studies
 Science Education
 Economics
 Educational Management
 English Studies
 Earth Sciences
 Estate Management
 Forestry and Wildlife Management
 Fisheries and Aquaculture
 Geography and Planning Science
 Guidance and Counselling
 History and International Studies
 Human Kinetics and Health Education
 Industrial Chemistry
 International Law
 Jurisprudence and International Law
 Linguistics and Languages
 Mathematic Sciences
 Mass Communication
 Microbiology
 Performing Arts
 Philosophy
 Physics and Electronics
 Physical and Health Education
 Plant Science and Biotechnology
 Political Science and Public Administration
 Private and Property Law
 Public Law
 Pure and Applied Psychology
 Quantity Surveying
 Religion and African Culture
 Science Education
 Social Science Education
 Sociology
 Urban and Regional Planning
 Vocational and Technical Education

Students' Union 
The AAUA Students' Union (AAUASU) has a large population of over 20,000 students.

In October 2021, the 6th e-voting President of the union, Comrade Ogunsanmi Kolade known on Campus as "Multiple"  was  inaugurated for the 2020–2021 session after the election on September 28, 2021. 

He became the first AAUA Students' Union President to emerge from Mass Communication Department

Sport 
AAUA's Sports Complex, provides indoor and out-door sports such as taekwondo, table tennis, badminton, soccer, basketball, cricket, judo, track and field events that encourage staff and students to keep fit physically. The centre is equipped with ultra-modern facilities which include a large gymnasium, Standard football pitch, Tennis court, and many other sports. AAUA students participate in competitive sports such as the Nigerian University Games Association and West African University's Games.

AAUA also participated in the  Higher Institutions Football League (HiFL) 2021 
AAUA played at the final of the HiFL against UNIMAID where they won the second-place position.

Past and Present Vice Chancellors
The Vice Chancellors are assisted by two deputy Vice Chancellors, both Academic and Administration.

Principal Officers

Achievements
During the wave of the #COVID-19 Pandemic, Scientists in the university with partners from  National Biotechnology Development Agency and Afe Babalola University conducted a research titled  "Aframomum melegueta secondary metabolites exhibit polypharmacology against SARS-CoV-2 drug targets: in vitro validation of furin inhibition" which resulted into the findings that Aframomum melegueta shows some potential for treating Covd-19.
The scientists out of which five are professors include: Olaposi Omotuyi, Oyekanmi Nash, Basiru O Ajiboye, Victor O Olumekun, Babatunji E Oyinloye, Oludare T Osuntokun, Adebisi Olonisakin, A Olajide Ajayi, Olasehinde Olusanya, Funmilola S Akomolafe, Niyi Adelakun.
 Akintewe Oluwadamiloa, a student of the university was the only Nigerian that made the top 10 shortlist for the inaugural Global Student Prize 2021 by Chegg and Varkey Foundation.

Faculties
Faculty of Agriculture
Faculty of Art
Faculty of Education
Faculty of Environmental Design and Management
Faculty of Law
Faculty of Science
Faculty of The Social Sciences
Faculty of Administration and Management Sciences

Affiliated colleges
 College Of Education, Lanlate

Photo Gallery

Notable alumni
Tunji Disu, police officer

References

External links

https://tribuneonlineng.com/akeredolu-appoints-ige-substantive-aaua-vc/
https://guardian.ng/features/health/alligator-pepper-based-cure-for-covid-19/
https://pubmed.ncbi.nlm.nih.gov/32964551/
https://pmnewsnigeria.com/2021/10/15/nigerian-student-akintewe-named-finalist-for-100k-global-student-prize/
https://www.dailynewsreport.com.ng/2022/09/admission-check-list-of-files-needed.html

1999 establishments in Nigeria
Adekunle Ajasin University
Educational institutions established in 1999